Oleg Radushko (born 10 January 1967) is a Belarusian professional football coach and a former player.

Managerial career
After retiring, Radushko worked as assistant coach at Neman Grodno. During 2019–2020 he managed Gorodeya.

References

External links
 
 Profile at Neman Grodno website

Living people
1967 births
Belarusian footballers
Soviet footballers
Association football midfielders
FC Dynamo Brest players
FC Dinamo Minsk players
FC Dnepr Mogilev players
FC Volna Pinsk players
FC Neman Grodno players
Belarusian Premier League players
Belarusian football managers
Belarusian expatriate football managers
Expatriate football managers in Poland
FC Neman Grodno managers
Olimpia Elbląg managers
FC Gorodeya managers
Belarus national football team managers
Sportspeople from Pinsk